Fredericton-Fort Naswaak was an electoral district returning members to the Legislative Assembly of New Brunswick for three elections: 1995, 1999, and 2003.

It was created in the 1994 electoral redistribution taking in the easternmost portions of the City of Fredericton taking about half of its territory from each of Fredericton North and Fredericton South on either side of the Saint John River.

It elected Liberals Greg Byrne and Kelly Lamrock in the 1995 and 2003 elections respectively but elected Progressive Conservative Eric MacKenzie by a narrow margin in 1999 when his party swept the province winning 80% of the seats.

The district was abolished in the 2006 electoral redistribution when the Boundary Commission expressed a desire to use the Saint John River as a natural boundary between districts.  Somewhat confusingly though, the commission re-used the name Fredericton-Fort Nashwaak for a new district wholly on the north side of the Saint John River using all of the territories from that side of the river from this district as well as substantial portions of Fredericton North and Grand Lake.

Members of the Legislative Assembly

Election results

References

External links
Website of the Legislative Assembly of New Brunswick

Former provincial electoral districts of New Brunswick
Politics of Fredericton